Gozd is a settlement on the Tržič Bistrica River in the Municipality of Tržič in the Upper Carniola region of Slovenia.

The local church is dedicated to Saint Nicholas.

References

External links
Gozd at Geopedia

Populated places in the Municipality of Tržič